Atalanta is a heroine in Greek mythology.

Atalanta may also refer to:

Fauna
 Vanessa atalanta, a species of butterfly

Geography
 Atalanta (island), an island in the Opuntian Gulf in Greece
 Atalanti Island (Attica), an island in the Saronic Gulf in Greece also known as Atalanta
 Atalanta (Macedon), a town of ancient Macedon
 Atalanta (Santa Catarina), a town in Brazil
 Lake Atalanta, a manmade lake in Rogers, Arkansas

Sport
 Atalanta B.C., an Italian association football club
 Atalanta Mozzanica Calcio Femminile Dilettantistico, an Italian women association football club. It was sponsored by Atalanta B.C.
Huddersfield Atalanta Ladies F.C., 1920s English women's football team

Vehicles

Railway locomotives
 Atalanta, a GWR 3031 Class locomotive built for and run on the Great Western Railway between 1891 and 1915

Automobiles
 Atalanta (1910 automobile), a British car made by Owen of London circa 1910.
 Atalanta (1915 automobile), a British car made from 1915 to 1917
 Atalanta (1936 automobile), a touring model of the British Armstrong Siddeley
 Atalanta (1937 automobile), a British sports car made between 1937 and 1939
 Atalanta Motors, British sports car company relaunched in 2012
 Bugatti Type 57#Atalante, a sports car made from 1936 to 1938

Aircraft
 Fairey N.4 (Atalanta) Prototype of the Fairey N.4 class of flying boat
 Armstrong Whitworth Atalanta (A.W. 15), a British aircraft of the 1930s manufactured by Armstrong Whitworth
 Lockheed P-38 Lightning, known as the Lockheed Atalanta in design, a World War II era fighter plane

Vessels

Ships
 , one of several mercantile vessels of that name
 HMS Atalanta, one of six ships in the British navy bearing this name

Yachts
 Fairey Atalanta, a class of sailing yacht built by Fairey Marine Ltd, variants 20, 26, and 30 feet overall
 Atalanta (1883), a steam yacht owned by Jay Gould, later a gunboat of the Venezuelan Navy and for a short time of the German Imperial Navy

Other uses
 Atalanta, a character in George Frideric Handel's opera Serse (also known as Xerxes)
 Atalanta (opera), an opera by George Frideric Handel
 Atalanta (Pantheon), a member of the Pantheon, a fictional group from Marvel Comics
 Atalanta (magazine) (1887–1898), a British literary magazine for girls
 Atalanta (sculpture), a sculpture by Francis Derwent Wood
 Operation Atalanta, an EU naval mission
Atalanta Ltd, a British women's engineering company operating between 1920 and 1928.

See also
 Atlanta, the largest city in the US state of Georgia
 Atalanti, a city in Greece
 Atlanta (disambiguation)
 Atalante (disambiguation)